Count László Markovits de Spizza et Kisterpest (born 4 April 1970) is a former tennis player from Hungary, son of water polo player and national team captain Kálmán Markovits and World champion handballer Márta Balogh. He was the winner of Hungarian National Tennis Championships in singles in 1986 (the youngest winner in seniors category in Hungarian tennis history with his age of 16) and has won it two times. He represented his native country as a lucky loser at the 1992 Barcelona Olympics in Barcelona in singles and partnered with Sándor Noszály for the doubles, but both ended in the first round, losing in four sets and being forced to retire respectively. He reached the second round in the 1988 Seoul Olympics and 1996 Atlanta Olympics teamed up with Gábor Köves. In the 1991 Davis Cup  Euro/African Group I 1st Round Play-offs he defended Hungary to be relegated to Group II by winning the second and third match (singles and doubles) against Morocco  resulting in the irreversible 3–0 lead (5–0 in total). He was a member as a reserve of the 1993 team, whose victory over Argentina resulted in advancing to the World Group and an active member of the 1995 team who shocked Australia by knocking them out in the World Group play-offs. He was a recurring member of the team over a decade (1987–97) clinching a 9–8 win–loss record in doubles but being less successful in singles (1–7 in overall). He has later become the chairman of Vasas SC.

Career finals

Doubles (4 titles – 5 runners-up)

References

External links
 
 
 

1970 births
Counts of Hungary
Hungarian nobility
Hungarian male tennis players
Living people
Olympic tennis players of Hungary
Tennis players at the 1988 Summer Olympics
Tennis players at the 1996 Summer Olympics